Kira Kiralina (or Kyra Kyralina) is a 2014 Romanian film directed by Dan Pița. It is based on the novel by the same name published by Panait Istrati in 1924.

Plot summary

Cast
 Florin Zamfirescu as Ilie
 Ovidiu Niculescu as Sima
 Constantin Florescu as Cosma
 Mircea Rusu as Rotarul
 Andrei Runcanu as Leonard
 Ștefan Iancu as Dragomir (age 15)
 Maria Teslaru as Veturia
 Corneliu Ulici as Dragomir (age 35)
 Iulia Dumitru as Chira
 Iulian Glita as Mogâldeață
 Silviu Debu as Vasile 
 József Bíró as Nazim 
 Mihai Raducu as Ibrahim
 Iulia Cirstea as Chiralina
 Iuliana Nedelea as Fana
 Dana Borteanu as Mrs. Pavlik

References

External links
 
 

2014 films
2010s Romanian-language films
Films directed by Dan Pița
Romanian drama films
Films based on Romanian novels